Edgar Montaño Rojas (born 23 August 1971) is a Bolivian engineer and politician serving as the Minister of Public Works, Services, and Housing under the government of Luis Arce. He was previously a member of the Chamber of Deputies for Santa Cruz.

Career 
Montaño was appointed Minister of Public Works by President Luis Arce on 9 November 2020. On 11 January 2021, Montaño became the third member of the Arce cabinet to contract COVID-19, amid the second-wave of the virus in the country. After two weeks, Montaño returned to his duties on 25 January.

References 

 

1971 births
Living people
People from Santa Cruz Department (Bolivia)
Movement for Socialism (Bolivia) politicians
Government ministers of Bolivia
Members of the Chamber of Deputies (Bolivia)
21st-century Bolivian politicians